William Harris House may refer to:

in the United States (by state)
William Harris Homestead, Campton, Walton County, Georgia, also known and NRHP-listed as William Harris Family Farmstead
Senator William A. Harris House, Linwood, Kansas, listed on the NRHP in Leavenworth County, Kansas
William B. Harris House, Zanesville, Ohio, NRHP-listed
William H. Harris House, Park City, Utah, listed on the NRHP in Summit County, Utah
William Harris House (Brattleboro, Vermont), listed on the NRHP in Windham County, Vermont

See also
Harris House (disambiguation)